The Central District of Shirvan County is a district (bakhsh) in Shirvan County, North Khorasan Province, Iran. At the 2006 census, its population was 126,928, in 31,926 families.  The District has two cities: Shirvan & Ziarat. The District has five rural districts (dehestan): Golian Rural District, Howmeh Rural District, Sivkanlu Rural District, Zavarom Rural District, and Ziarat Rural District.

References 

Districts of North Khorasan Province
Shirvan County